The Clinton Blankenbeker House, at 7414 US 42 in Florence, Kentucky, is a historic house built in 1927.  It was listed on the National Register of Historic Places in 1989.  The listing also included two other contributing buildings and a contributing structure.

It is a one-and-a-half-story common bond brick house.  It was deemed "a good example of the Craftsman/Bungalow style, significant to Boone County in the period 1905-1930. The garage, chicken coop, and well head are important outbuildings and related resources which define the architecture space and function of houses during the period of significance."

References

Houses on the National Register of Historic Places in Kentucky
Houses completed in 1927
Houses in Boone County, Kentucky
National Register of Historic Places in Boone County, Kentucky
1927 establishments in Kentucky
American Craftsman architecture in Kentucky
Bungalow architecture in Kentucky
Florence, Kentucky